Torchyn is an urban-type settlement in Lutsk Raion of Volyn Oblast in Ukraine. It is located on the banks of the Serna in the drainage basin of the Dnieper. Population:

Economy

Transportation
The closed railway station is in Lutsk.

The settlement is on Highway H22 connecting Lutsk and Volodymyr.

Notable people
 Jacek Rybiński, Polish Cistercian abbot

References

Urban-type settlements in Lutsk Raion